The suprahyoid muscles are four muscles located above the hyoid bone in the neck. They are the digastric, stylohyoid, geniohyoid, and mylohyoid muscles. They are all pharyngeal muscles, with the exception of the geniohyoid muscle. The digastric is uniquely named for its two bellies. Its posterior belly rises from the mastoid process of the cranium and slopes downward and forward. The anterior belly arises from the digastric fossa on the inner surface of the mandibular body, which slopes downward and backward. The two bellies connect at the intermediate tendon. The intermediate tendon passes through a connective tissue loop attached to the hyoid bone. The mylohyoid muscles are thin, flat muscles that form a sling inferior to the tongue supporting the floor of the mouth. The geniohyoids are short, narrow muscles that contact each other in the midline. The stylohyoids are long, thin muscles that are nearly parallel with the posterior belly of the digastric muscle.

Function
These four muscles have different actions, but in general assist in elevating the hyoid bone and widening the esophagus during swallowing. When the two bellies of the digastric contract, they pull upward on the hyoid bone; but if the hyoid is fixed from below, the digastric assists in extreme opening of the mouth such as yawning or taking a large bite of an apple. The mylohyoid elevates the hyoid bone, tenses the floor of the mouth.  The Geniohyoid pulls the hyoid bone anterosuperiorly, shortening the floor of the mouth and widening the pharynx during swallowing. The Stylohyoid elevates and retracts the hyoid bone, elongating the floor of the mouth during swallowing.

See also
Infrahyoid muscles

References

 
Muscles of the head and neck